The 26 districts of Lebanon are sub-divided into towns with municipalities and towns without municipalities headed only by a Mukhtar. The power of Mukhtar is limited to the residents Personal status administration and does not include the town development, jurisdictions, Municipal Police. The following is the list of town in Lebanon without municipalities.

Akkar Governorate

Akkar District

Baalbek-Hermel Governorate

Baalbeck District

Hermel District

Beqaa Governorate

Rachaya District

Western Bekaa District

Zahle District

Mount Lebanon Governorate

Aley District

Baabda District

Chouf District

Byblos District
 Aabaydat
 Adonis
 Ain Ed Delbeh
 Ain Jrain
 Ain Kfaa
 Bazyoun
 Bchilleh
 Beer El Hit
 Behdidat
 Bekhaaz
 Beithabbak
 Bentaël
 Birket Hjoula
 Boulhos
 Brayj
 Chatine
 Chikhane
 Chmout
 Ferhet
 Fghal
 Ghabat
 Ghalboun
 Gharzouz
 Ghorfine
 Habil
 Haqel
 Hay El Aarabeh
 Hbaline
 Hboub
 Hdayneh
 Hsarat
 Janneh
 Jenjol
 Jlisseh
 Jouret El Qattine
 Kafr
 Kfar Hbal
 Kfar Hitta
 Kfar Kiddeh
 Kfar Masshoun
 Kfar Qouas
 Kfoun
 Maad
 Marj
 Mchane
 Qahmez
 Qartaboun
 Qorqraiya
 Ram
 Rihaneh
 Seraaita
 Souaneh
 Tourzaiya
 Zibdine

Keserouan District

Metn District

Nabitieh Governorate

Bint Jbeil District

Hasbaya District

Marjeeyoun District

Nabatieh District

North Lebanon Governorate

Batroun District

Becharre District

Koura District

Minieh-Denniye District

Tripoli District

Zghorta District

South Lebanon Governorate

Jezzine District

Sidon District

Tyre District

See also
 Governorates of Lebanon
 Districts of Lebanon
 Subdivisions of Lebanon

Lists of subdivisions of Lebanon
Lebanon geography-related lists